The Karnataka Science and Technology Academy (KSTA) is an organization established in 2005 to promote science and technology-related activities in the Indian State of Karnataka. It functions under the Department of Science and Technology of the government of Karnataka. The KSTA organizes programmes and conferences across Karnataka with an aim to "bring scientific awareness" and "popularize... science among  general public." The body is headed by a chairman and includes 20 other members, that includes 14 nominated members and 5 ex officio members:  secretaries, principal secretaries, and directors of other departments of the government of Karnataka.

References

External links 
 

1954 establishments in Mysore State
Scientific organisations based in India
State agencies of Karnataka
Organisations based in Bangalore